In the United States, for most of the history of broadcasting, there were only three or four major commercial national terrestrial networks. From 1946 to 1956, these were ABC, CBS, NBC and DuMont (though the Paramount Television Network had some limited success during these years). From 1956 to 1986, the "Big Three" national commercial networks were ABC, CBS, and NBC (with a few limited attempts to challenge them, such as National Telefilm Associates [and its NTA Film Network] and the Overmyer Network). From 1954 to 1970, National Educational Television was the national clearinghouse for public TV programming; the Public Broadcasting Service (PBS) succeeded it in 1970.

Today, more than fifty national free-to-air networks exist. Other than the non-commercial educational (NCE) PBS, which is composed of member stations, the largest terrestrial television networks are the traditional Big Three television networks (ABC, CBS and NBC). Many other large networks exist, however, notably Fox and The CW which air original programming for two hours each night instead of three like the original "Big Three" do, as well as MyNetworkTV and Ion Television, which feature reruns of recent popular shows with little to no original programming. Fox has just about the same household reach percentage as the Big Three, and is therefore often considered a peer to ABC, CBS, and NBC since it has also achieved equal or better ratings since the late 1990s; as of 2019, it also programs the equivalent amount of sports programming as the Big Three. Most media outlets now include Fox in what they refer to as the "Big Four" TV networks.

The transition to digital broadcasting in 2009 has allowed for television stations to offer additional programming options through digital subchannels, one or more supplementary programming streams to the station's primary channel that are achieved through multiplexing of a station's signal. A number of new commercial networks airing specialty programming such as movies, reruns of classic series and lifestyle programs have been created from companies like Weigel Broadcasting, Sinclair Broadcast Group and even owners of the major networks such as Fox Corporation (through the Fox Entertainment subsidiary), Paramount Global (through the CBS Media Ventures subsidiary), The Walt Disney Company (through the Walt Disney Television subsidiary) and Comcast (through the NBCUniversal subsidiary). Through the use of multicasting, there have also been a number of new Spanish-language and non-commercial public TV networks that have launched.

Free-to-air networks in the U.S. can be divided into five categories:
 Commercial networks – which air English-language programming to a general audience (for example, ABC, CBS, NBC, and Fox);
 Spanish-language networks – fully programmed networks which air Spanish-language programming to a primarily Latin American audience (for example, Telemundo and Univision);
 Educational and other non-commercial broadcast networks – which air English- and some foreign-language television programming, intended to be educational in nature or otherwise of a sort not found on commercial television (for example, PBS);
 Religious broadcast networks – which air religious study and other faith-based programs, and in some cases, family-oriented secular programs (for example, Daystar and TBN).
 Shopping networks – which air live presentations of various products intended to be sold directly to the viewer (for example, HSN and QVC).

Each network sends its signal to many local affiliate television stations across the country. These local stations then air the "network feed," with programs broadcast by each network being viewed by up to tens of millions of households across the country. In the case of the largest networks, the signal is sent to over 200 stations. In the case of the smallest networks, the signal may be sent to just a dozen or fewer stations.

As of the 2016–17 television season, there are an estimated 118.4 million households in the U.S. with at least one TV set.

Major

Commercial
 NBC (owned by Comcast)
 CBS (owned by Paramount Global)
 ABC (owned by Disney)
 Fox (owned by Fox Corporation)
 The CW (co-owned by Nexstar Media Group - 75% & Warner Bros. Discovery and Paramount Global - 12.5% each)
 The CW Plus

Spanish
 Telemundo
 Univision
 UniMás

Non-commercial
 PBS (cooperative public television network)

Minor

Commercial
 MyNetworkTV (owned by Fox Corporation)
 Ion Television (owned by Scripps Networks subsidiary of E. W. Scripps Company)

Spanish
 Estrella TV

Table of networks
All of the networks listed below operate a number of terrestrial TV stations. In addition, several of these networks are also aired on pay television services.

Information on networks

Conventional commercial networks
 American Broadcasting Company (ABC) – The nation's third-largest commercial network, ABC was originally formed from the NBC Blue Network (1927–1945), a radio network which the Federal Communications Commission (FCC) forced NBC (National Broadcasting Company) to sell in 1943 for anti-monopoly reasons, the ABC-TV network began broadcasting in 1948. Owned by The Walt Disney Company, ABC airs original programming, sports, and news seven days a week. It has over 200 owned-and-operated and affiliate stations, almost all of which air local newscasts.
 CBS (originally the Columbia Broadcasting System) – The nation's second-largest commercial network, it originated as the CBS Radio Network in 1927; the CBS-TV network commenced broadcasts in 1941. Owned now by Paramount Global, CBS airs original programming, sports and news seven days a week. The network has over 200 owned-and-operated and affiliate stations, almost all of which air local newscasts. For most of its existence, CBS has been the nation's most watched network.
 National Broadcasting Company (NBC) – The nation's largest and oldest commercial network, the NBC-TV network was formed out of the NBC Red Network radio service, which launched in 1926; the network commenced television broadcasts in 1939. Owned by NBCUniversal, NBC airs original programming, sports and news seven days a week. It has over 200 owned-and-operated and affiliate stations, almost all of which air local newscasts.
 Fox Broadcasting Company (Fox) – The nation's fourth-largest commercial network owned by Fox Corporation, Fox was launched in October 1986 through former parent News Corporation's purchase of Metromedia earlier that year (two of the network's owned-and-operated stations once owned by that group at its founding had formed the hub of the old DuMont Television Network, which existed from 1944 to 1956) and the purchase of the 20th Century Fox film studio, originally established in 1915 as Fox Film Corporation by William Fox and 20th Century Pictures founded 1933 and merged into Fox Film in 1935, five years after founder Fox lost control. After a half-century of up and down success, the studio now by Fox Corporation with Australian and later British and American newspaper chain mogul Rupert Murdoch who had bought into the studio in 1985. Fox airs first-run programming and sports seven days a week, programming two hours each night in primetime (three hours on Sundays), along with political talk program Fox News Sunday on Sunday mornings and the optional infomercial block Weekend Marketplace on Saturday mornings. (Fox also allows affiliates the option to air the Xploration Station block on Saturday mornings in place of Weekend Marketplace.) It has nearly 200 owned-and-operated and affiliate stations, almost all of which air local newscasts, with some producing newscasts in-house and others airing newscasts produced by a local affiliate of another major network.
 The CW – The nation's fifth-largest commercial network, The CW was originally formed by CBS Corporation (which later merged with Viacom to create ViacomCBS, now Paramount Global) and Time Warner (later WarnerMedia, which eventually merged with Discovery Inc. to form Warner Bros. Discovery) as a replacement for The WB and UPN, both of which folded in September 2006 after 11 years of existence and whose programs formed most of its initial schedule. Nexstar Media Group, the largest owner of television stations in the country, bought a 75% stake and controlling interest in the network in 2022; Paramount Global and Warner Bros. Discovery each retain a 12.5% stake. The CW maintains approximately 100 owned-and-operated and affiliate stations in the top 100 television markets; it also has approximately 90 additional cable-only and digital subchannel affiliations in smaller TV markets through a programming service feed known as The CW Plus. The network airs two hours of first-run programming in primetime on Monday through Sunday, as well as a three-hour children's programming block on Saturday mornings called One Magnificent Morning and coverage of LIV Golf on weekends. Unlike the larger networks, The CW does not directly own its flagship station in New York City; WPIX is instead owned by Mission Broadcasting and operated under a LMA by Nexstar. The CW also does not have a owned-and-operated station in Chicago, due to Nexstar's ownership of independent station WGN-TV in that area. Some CW affiliates air local newscasts, most of which are produced by another station in the market though four of its affiliates (most owned by Nexstar) produce local newscasts in-house.
 MyNetworkTV – The nation's sixth-largest commercial network, MyNetworkTV is a programming service owned by Fox Corporation, which is also parent of the Fox network. It was hastily formed in February 2006 to provide programming for stations left out of affiliation with The CW, after CBS Corporation and Time Warner chose to shut down UPN and The WB to form that network. The network launched in September 2006 with a format of English-language telenovelas, but gradually switched to mainly low-budget programming by the end of its first year. Since it converted from a TV network into a programming service in 2009, MyNetworkTV fills its two-hour primetime schedule on Monday through Fridays with reruns of drama series that originated on other broadcast and cable networks. Some MyNetworkTV affiliates air local newscasts, most of which are produced by another station in the market though three of its affiliates (most owned by Nexstar) produce local newscasts in-house. Some affiliates also carry the nightly scheduled out of primetime to accommodate those newscasts and alternate programming (or in the case of several affiliates are primary Fox affiliates), and offer MyNetworkTV as a late night offering instead. For the Fox Television Stations group, most of its stations now brand as a "Plus" station of the larger Fox O&O station if part of a duopoly.
 Ion Television – Ion Television (originally known as Pax TV from 1998 to 2005, i: Independent Television from 2005 to 2007) is a mid-sized network owned by the Katz Broadcasting subsidiary of the E. W. Scripps Company; it airs off-network repeats of recent television series (usually a daily block of one series) for eighteen hours per day. Ion is the largest English-language network that is wholly responsible for handling programming on behalf of its affiliates, some of which run limited locally produced public affairs and religious programming. It has around 48 owned-and-operated and 23 affiliated stations, the majority of which were owned by former parent Ion Media; Ion is available in markets without an over-the-air (OTA) affiliate via a national feed that is distributed to pay-television providers and AVOD streaming services. As Pax TV and i, it aired several hours a week of original programming in primetime (often produced in conjunction with NBC).

Minor and digital multicast commercial networks
 MeTV (a backronym for "Memorable Entertainment Television") – MeTV is a network owned by Weigel Broadcasting that airs reruns of classic series from the 1950s to the 1990s sourced primarily from the CBS Media Ventures, NBCUniversal Syndication Studios and Disney Platform Distribution program libraries, as well as some limited content from Weigel. The network maintains over 160 affiliates (mainly through digital subchannel affiliations, with a small number of stations carrying it as a primary network affiliation), making it the most widely distributed multicast network and the seventh-largest commercial broadcast network in the U.S.
 MeTV+ - MeTV's sister network also owned by Weigel Broadcasting that airs more reruns of classic series from the 1950s to the 1990s from the CBS Media Ventures, NBCUniversal Syndication Studios, Sony Pictures Television, and Disney Platform Distribution program libraries, also with some limited content from Weigel. MeTV+ was launched in 2021.
 Story Television, a digital multicast network also owned by Weigel Broadcasting launched on March 28, 2022. The network's focus is on historical and factual programming and utilizes the library of the cable network History, expanding its non-fiction offerings beyond Through the Decades.
 This TV – This TV is a movie-oriented multicast network owned by the Allen Media Group unit of Entertainment Studios; originally owned by MGM in conjunction with Weigel Broadcasting and later Tribune Broadcasting, the network was launched on November 1, 2008. The network primarily carries feature films from the libraries of MGM and select other film studios (such as Paramount Pictures, Universal Pictures and Sony Pictures Entertainment), as well as limited amount of TV series from the 1950s to the 1990s. The network maintains over 110 affiliate stations (primarily on digital subchannels, with a small number of stations carrying the network as a primary network affiliation), making This TV the eighth-largest commercial broadcast network in the U.S.
 Antenna TV – Antenna TV is a digital multicast network owned by Nexstar Media Group; launched on January 1, 2011, the network carries classic series from the 1950s to the 1970s sourced from the programming libraries of Sony Pictures Television, NBCUniversal Syndication Studios and Disney Platform Distribution, as well as other distributors.
 Rewind TV – Rewind TV is a companion network to Antenna TV also owned by Nexstar which specifically carries sitcoms from the 1980s and 1990s. The network launched on September 1, 2021.
 Movies! – Movies! is a digital multicast network owned as a joint venture between Weigel Broadcasting and Fox Television Stations; launched on May 23, 2013 and natively transmitted in the 16:9 format, the network features theatrically released feature films from the 1920s to the 1980s primarily sourced from the 20th Century Studios library, as well as select titles from Sony Pictures Entertainment and Paramount Pictures, most of which are broadcast in the aspect ratio to which they were originally produced. Movies! maintains subchannel-only affiliations with approximately 45 stations. 
 Bounce TV – Bounce TV is a digital multicast network owned by Katz Broadcasting; co-founded by Martin Luther King III and Andrew Young, and launched on September 26, 2011. Its programming is aimed at African Americans between the ages of 25 and 54, featuring a mix of acquired sitcoms, game shows, talk shows, original programs, and feature films. Bounce TV maintains affiliations with approximately 45 stations (the vast majority of which are subchannel-only affiliations), primarily in markets with sizeable African-American populations.
 Cozi TV – Cozi TV is a digital multicast network owned by the NBCUniversal Owned Television Stations subsidiary of NBCUniversal; launched on January 1, 2013, the network carries classic series from the 1950s to the 1990s sourced from the NBCUniversal Television Distribution programming library, as well as lifestyle programming and feature films. Cozi TV traces its history to the 2010 launch of NBC Nonstop, a local news and lifestyle programming subchannel format that spread to most of NBC's owned-and-operated stations. The network maintains approximately 65 affiliates, including all of NBC's owned-and-operated stations (nearly all of which carry the network on digital subchannels).
 GetTV – GetTV is a digital multicast network owned by Sony Pictures Entertainment; launched on February 13, 2014, the network focuses on classic theatrically released films from the 1920s to the 1960s sourced mainly from Sony Pictures library. Most are broadcast in the aspect ratio to which they were originally produced. However, due to the network's native 4:3 transmission, films presented in widescreen are presented with letterboxing). The network maintains subchannel-only affiliations with approximately 64 affiliates, along with a bulk carriage agreement with their Sony sister networks on Dish Network.
 Comet – Comet is a digital multicast network owned by Sinclair Broadcast Group and operated by Metro-Goldwyn-Mayer through its MGM Television division; launched on October 31, 2015; the network features sci-fi and fantasy based programming sourced primarily from the MGM television and film library. Comet maintains affiliations with 100 stations (nearly all of which carry the network on digital subchannels).
 Charge! – Charge! is a digital multicast network owned by Sinclair Broadcast Group and operated by Metro-Goldwyn-Mayer through its MGM Television division; launched on February 28, 2017; the network features action and adventure based programming sourced primarily from the MGM television and film library. Charge! maintains affiliations with 56 stations (nearly all of which carry the network on digital subchannels).
 Court TV – A renewal of the format which was formerly a cable channel until its 2007 relaunch as TruTV, Court TV is a digital multicast network owned by Katz Broadcasting licensing the branding and format from WarnerMedia; launched on May 8, 2019 and natively transmitted in the 16:9 format (although some programs are stretched to 16:9 if not already available in the format), the network features crime-themed programs such as true crime documentary series, legal dramas, and coverage of prominent criminal cases. Court TV maintains subchannel-only affiliations with approximately 65 affiliates.
 Ion Mystery – Ion Mystery (originally known as Escape until 2019, then Court TV Mystery until 2022) is a digital multicast network owned by Katz Broadcasting; launched on August 8, 2014 and natively transmitted in the 16:9 format (although some programs are stretched to 16:9 if not already available in the format), the network features crime-focused documentary series, as well as theatrically released mystery and crime drama films aimed at a female audience. Ion Mystery maintains subchannel-only affiliations with approximately 35 affiliates.
 Grit – Grit is a digital multicast network owned by Katz Broadcasting; launched on August 8, 2014 and natively transmitted in the 16:9 format (although some programs are stretched to 16:9 if not already available in the format), the network features theatrically released action and western films, as well as a limited amount of classic series aimed at a male audience. Grit maintains subchannel-only affiliations with around 45 stations.
 WeatherNation TV – WeatherNation TV is a television and online network owned by WeatherNation, LLC; launched on October 27, 2011 and natively transmitted in the 16:9 format. The network features national and regional weather forecasts and analysis. The network's broadcast affiliates also air local weather updates provided by the station's weather staff or via an automated graphical segment. The network maintains subchannel-only affiliations with approximately 35 stations; WeatherNation is also available on select cable and satellite providers, as well as via streaming on computers, mobile devices and Smart TVs.
 TBD – TBD is a digital multicast network owned by Sinclair Broadcast Group and operated by Jukin Media; launched on February 13, 2017, the network primarily carries various web-originated films, scripted and unscripted series, showcase programming, and featurettes on a wide range of topical and themed categories including, but not limited to, science, fashion, lifestyle, travel, music, comedy, gaming, esports, and viral content. Some traditional full-length films and documentaries also air on the network. TBD maintains subchannel-only affiliations with 55 stations owned and/or operated by Sinclair.
 Decades – Decades is a digital multicast network owned by Weigel Broadcasting; launched officially on May 25, 2015 after a soft launch on January 16, the network carries classic television sitcoms and drama series from the 1950s to the 2000s, feature films from the same period, and historical news and documentary programming, most of which is sourced from the CBS Television Distribution library. Decades maintains subchannel-only affiliations with 54 stations.
 Start TV – Start TV is a digital multicast network owned by a joint venture between Paramount Global and Weigel Broadcasting; launched on September 3, 2018, the network carries crime drama and mystery series from the 1980s through the 2000s, with a focus on police and legal procedurals geared toward female audiences. Start TV maintains subchannel-only affiliations with 27 stations.
 Heroes & Icons – Heroes & Icons (abbreviated as "H&I") is a digital multicast network owned by Weigel Broadcasting; launched in September 2014, the network carries classic series and films intended to attract a generally male audience (featuring a mix of action series, police procedurals, westerns, science fiction/fantasy series and military-themed series). Heroes & Icons maintains affiliations with around 15 stations (nearly all of which carry the network as a subchannel-only affiliation).
 Buzzr – Buzzr is a digital multicast network owned by FremantleMedia North America; launched on June 1, 2015, the network carries classic game shows sourced from FremantleMedia's extensive library. The network traces its roots to a YouTube channel of the same name created and produced by Fremantle's digital content studio Tiny Riot, which debuted in late 2014 and featured classic game show clips, and short-form adaptations of its game show properties with internet celebrities as contestants. Buzzr maintains affiliations with 51 stations (most of which carry the network as a subchannel-only affiliation).
 Retro Television Network – Retro Television Network (branded as "Retro TV") is a digital multicast network owned by Luken Communications; launched in September 2005 as the first multicast network to rely on older acquired programs, the network carries a mix of classic series from the 1950s to the 1970s (including some public domain programming), along with recent imported series and feature films. Retro Television Network maintains affiliations with approximately 85 stations (most of which carry the network as a subchannel-only affiliation, and are mostly owned by parent Luken Communications).
 YTA TV – A successor to Channel America and formerly named America One and Youtoo America, YTA TV is a network featuring general entertainment programming (which is wholly scheduled by the network for its affiliates), with a heavy emphasis on primetime sports programming and events; it maintains affiliations with approximately sixty stations. America One merged with Youtoo TV in the spring of 2015, a cable service which dates back to 1985 as a network with multiple names, formats and owners, including the Nostalgia Channel and American Life Network.
 ShopHQ – Generally thought of as the third-rated American home shopping network (behind the co-owned HSN and QVC, who also have some broadcast clearance), cable channel ShopHQ, formerly ValueVision and ShopNBC in the past, acquired main-channel major-market carriage controversially in June 2021, when WRNN-TV Associates, which had bought several large-market stations in the late 2010s with the proceeds it received from the FCC spectrum auction for selling off the bandwidth of New York station WRNN-TV, converted the main channel of their stations to ShopHQ, which pushed out ethnic programs and broadcasters which formerly filled that space under previous ownership and generally angered viewers and carriage providers for doing so. The existing local management of one station, Honolulu, Hawaii's KIKU, openly agitated for a sale in order to restore their Japanese-Filipino schedule, which came to fruition through Bryon Allen's Entertainment Studios.

Additionally, several of the cable-oriented theme channels (e.g. music or shopping channels) have obtained broadcast clearances, usually on low-power stations, in many markets.

Spanish-language commercial networks
 Univision – The flagship property of corporate parent Univision Communications, Univision was formed in 1986 following the sale of predecessor Spanish International Network (SIN) to Hallmark from Mexican broadcaster Televisa due to federal laws that restrict foreign ownership of U.S. TV networks. The network airs a mix of telenovelas, news and variety programming (either produced by the network or sourced primarily from Televisa), as well as soccer events and occasional Mexican-imported feature films. It is the nation's largest commercial Spanish-language network, with approximately 120 owned-and-operated and affiliate stations (including over 50 full-power stations); Univision is available in markets without an over-the-air affiliate via a national feed (east and west channels) that is distributed to satellite providers. Most of its stations produce and/or broadcast local newscasts, usually limited to weekday evening time slots in most markets. Since the mid-2000s, Univision has ranked as the fifth highest-rated commercial network overall on average, currently placing ahead of English language competitor The CW.
 Telemundo – Telemundo is a general entertainment network owned by NBCUniversal; the network carries a mix of original and imported telenovelas, general and entertainment news programs, feature films (both dubbed and natively produced in Spanish), sports and variety programming (much of the network's programming is filmed in the network's homebase of Miami, although its imported programming is sourced from Mexico, Colombia and to a lesser extent, Brazil). The nation's second-largest commercial Spanish-language network, Telemundo has over 100 owned-and-operated and affiliate stations (including approximately 40 full-power stations); it is also available in Mexico and Puerto Rico (where it was founded in 1954 as the brand name for WKAQ-TV). Most Telemundo stations air local newscasts, primarily aired in evening timeslots, although some affiliates also produce public affairs programming. Telemundo is available in markets without an over-the-air affiliate via a national feed (east and west channels) that is distributed to cable and satellite providers.
 UniMás (known as TeleFutura from its launch in January 2002 until January 2013) – UniMás is a general entertainment network owned by Univision Communications, which airs a mix of original and imported programming, consisting of telenovelas, Spanish-dubbed versions of U.S. feature films and sports programming aimed primarily at teenagers and young adults ages 12 to 34. UniMás maintains nearly 45 owned-and-operated and affiliate stations (including 35 full-power stations), and is the third-largest commercial Spanish-language network in the U.S.; UniMás is available in markets without an over-the-air affiliate via a national feed (east and west channels) that is distributed to satellite providers.
 Estrella TV – Estrella TV is a general entertainment network owned by Estrella Media (formerly Liberman Broadcasting); it airs mainly original variety programming, as well as general and entertainment news programming, limited scripted programming and imported Mexican feature films. The network was launched in 2009, featuring programming originally produced for the Liberman-owned Spanish language independent stations that formed the nucleus of the network. Estrella TV maintains nearly 35 owned-and-operated and affiliate stations (most of which are owned by Estrella or carry the network as a subchannel-only affiliation), and is the fourth-largest commercial Spanish-language network; it is also available nationally on select cable providers.
 Multimedios Televisión – Multimedios is a general entertainment network based out of Monterrey, Nuevo León which features mainly live studio variety programming and news, and is a major regional network in Northeastern Mexico which also features several stations along the Southern Texas border, and tailors their programming (and through local stations, news programming) to both Mexican and American viewers. The network is distributed through several separately owned over-the-air affiliates in the U.S. mainly in the Southwest and southern Texas, and nationally through cable providers and DirecTV.
 LATV – LATV is a bilingual general entertainment network owned by LATV Networks, LLC; originated as a programming format on KJLA in Los Angeles, the network's lone owned-and-operated station, it became a national network in 2007. It relies largely on unscripted programming aimed at young adults between the ages of 18 and 34, featuring a mix of variety, music, lifestyle and talk programs (most of which are sourced by MVS Television and Multimedios Televisión); LATV also airs a limited amount of English language programming, including overnight content from cable/satellite shopping network Shop LC. LATV maintains nearly 40 owned-and-operated and affiliate stations (available mostly on low-power stations).
 TeleXitos (originally known as Exitos TV from 2012 to December 2014) – TeleXitos is a digital multicast network owned by NBCUniversal; maintaining affiliations with 15 Telemundo owned-and-operated stations, the network originally carried a format featuring repeats of telenovelas (mainly those aired by Telemundo), before rebranding in December 2014 to feature Spanish dubbed versions of U.S. classic action-adventure series and feature films, effectively acting as a Spanish counterpart to fellow network Cozi TV.

Additionally, Televisa, which distributes programming to Univision in the United States, operates in Mexico, but the company's networks (Canal de las Estrellas, Canal 5 and Nueve) have certain stations which can be received in parts of the U.S. located along and near the Mexican border, and likewise with the American networks have affiliates located or receivable in Mexican border cities. Some Mexican border stations (such as the former English-language ABC/Fox/CW affiliate XETV-TDT in Tijuana) who formerly maintained affiliations with U.S.-based English or Spanish networks, but mainly targeted their programming at their American border city (more than the Mexican metropolitan area that they are based in or merely licensed to).

Although the English-language programming model in the U.S. traditionally relies on the network and its stations handling programming responsibilities, Spanish language networks handle most of the responsibility for programming, while affiliates are limited to breakaways from the network feed to provide local news, public affairs and/or entertainment programming as well as local advertising. As such, all Spanish language networks primarily available on broadcast TV  operate national feeds that are distributed to cable and satellite providers in markets without a local affiliate. Spanish-language independent stations also exist, although (particularly with the launch of Estrella TV), these are very limited and they mainly exist in markets with a large Hispanic and Latino American population.

Public/cultural/educational non-commercial
 PBS (Public Broadcasting Service) – PBS is the largest public broadcasting network in the U.S., with somewhat decentralized operations (PBS is essentially owned through a consortium of its member stations, reversing the traditional network-station ownership model). The network operates or has operated 24-hour program feeds carried part-time or full-time by its member stations, the PBS Satellite Service (which maintains feeds for the Eastern and Pacific Time Zones, and was originally conceived as a cable-only channel for areas not served by a PBS station), PBS YOU (devoted largely to adult education, crafts, and public affairs programming, which ceased operations in January 2006), the PBS Kids Channel (a children's programming network, which was discontinued on September 26, 2005 (though later revived on January 16, 2017) in favor of the advertiser-supported cable channel PBS Kids Sprout). PBS allows its member stations to run the network's programs out of pattern; member stations generally produce their own local programming in the form of news (mainly weekly news/analysis series, though a few stations carry daily newscasts), documentary and lifestyle programming that is aired alongside the PBS schedule.
 NYC Media – NYC Media is the broadcasting service of the City of New York, which offers original programming. Available nationally on PBS stations, NYC Media in actuality, serves as a provider of programming to several noncommercial broadcasters in New York outside of its originating station, WNYE-TV.
 Annenberg Channel – Originally known as Annenberg/CPB Channel and formerly operating as a national educational access network for public broadcasters and schools that broadcast Annenberg/CPB programs, Annenberg Channel was available on some cable and satellite providers; it now operates as an online streaming service that is offered for carriage by broadcast stations and cable providers; many of the channel's broadcast affiliates carried its programming to fill overnight and "fringe" timeslots (with only a few still doing so). It shared some programming with PBS YOU, various university- and college-owned stations around the U.S., and the now defunct Research Channel.
 Deutsche Welle (DW-TV) – Deutsche Welle is a Germany-based non-commercial television service which provides some English-language news programming to public TV stations; its programming feed is available part-time on select educational independent stations, including some stations carried on the World Channel. DW-TV is also carried full time in some stations.
 Create – Create is a digital multicast network owned by American Public Television (in partnership with PBS, member stations WGBH-TV, WNET and WLIW, and the National Educational Television Association), offering instructional (consisting of cooking, crafts and home improvement series) and travel programming; the network was launched in January 2006 in part to fill the void left by the shut down of PBS YOU, and its primarily carried on the subchannels of PBS member stations.
 NHK World – A Japanese-based noncommercial television station that provides English-language news and other programs from NHK. 
 World Channel (also referred to as "World") – World is a digital multicast network owned by American Public Television (in partnership with PBS, WGBH-TV, WNET, WLIW and the National Educational Television Association), which primarily carries news and documentary programming.
 First Nations Experience (FNX) – FNX is a non-profit television network owned by the San Bernardino Community College District that airs programs aimed to Native Americans as well as Indigenous audiences. The network currently has 47 affiliates, most of which are part of PBS stations and universities.

Religious
 Cornerstone Television
 Daystar Television Network
 Eternal Word Television Network (EWTN) – Roman Catholic, primarily cable-based
 GEB America (Oral Roberts University)
 God's Learning Channel – Hebrew and Jewish roots of the Christian Faith
 Hope Channel – Seventh-day Adventist
 Loma Linda Broadcasting Network (LLBN)
 RadiantTV - Radiant TV is the brand for WLMB's overnight music block, consisting of nature scenes set to Christian music in a format similar to the now-discontinued Worship Network. WLMB syndicates Radiant TV to other Christian television networks, making it available nationwide.
 Trinity Broadcasting Network (TBN) – Ecumenical Christian
 Three Angels Broadcasting Network (3ABN) – Seventh-day Adventist
 Total Living Network (TLN) - carries lifestyle-oriented Christian televangelism, infomercials, and a limited number of secular lifestyle programs.
 Unity Broadcasting Network – five low-power stations
 World Harvest Television (WHT)/Family Broadcasting Corporation and fetv – family-oriented secular and religious programming (available over-the-air, live streaming platforms, and on satellite)
 The Word Network – African American Christian network

Several religious networks allow their broadcast affiliates to carry their programming out-of-pattern through clearance arrangements, notably TBN, 3ABN, Hope Channel and World Harvest Television.

Defunct networks

 American Independent Network – A commercial broadcast network, which operated from the mid-1990s to December 3, 2001; predecessor to UATV
 America's Store – A cable and satellite shopping network spun off from the Home Shopping Network, which operated from 1988 to April 3, 2007; its broadcast affiliates were a mix of stations that carried the network full-time as well as overnight clearances on minor network affiliates and independent stations.
 AZN Television (originally known as International Channel) – A broadcast and cable network, which operated from 1996 to April 9, 2008, featuring a mix of international programming, which launched before the advent of digital cable and satellite services that allowed carriage of various foreign networks; the AZN iteration offered programming aimed at English-speaking Asian-Americans.
 Azteca América – A general entertainment network owned by INNOVATE Corp. under a license by the Azteca International Corporation, which operated from July 28, 2001 to December 31, 2022. The network featured programming primarily sourced from the Mexican Azteca networks (though much of the American network's programming aired at different times), along with original and imported programming from other U.S. and Latin American distributors; it carried a mix of telenovelas, feature films (both dubbed and natively produced in Spanish), sports, news and variety programming. Azteca América maintained approximately 90 affiliates (including eight full-power stations); it was also available nationally on select cable providers.
 Badger Television Network – A short-lived television network consisting of three stations in Wisconsin; operated from January to August 1958.
 The Box (originally Video Jukebox Network) – A music video network with a viewer request format, which operated from 1985 to 2001, at which time the network was purchased by Viacom and replaced by MTV2. All of MTV2's remaining broadcast affiliates were former affiliates of The Box.
 Channel America – A commercial broadcast network which operated from 1988 to 1995; it was the first commercial television network whose affiliate body was intentionally made up of low-power stations, serving as a model for Pax and AIN/UATV, and a predecessor of America One.
 CV Network (formally CaribeVisión) – A Spanish-language network, which operated from 2007 to July 31, 2012; network closed prior to the launch of MundoFox.
 Doctor Television Channel – A network that aired programming promoting a healthy lifestyle. Ceased operations in 2019.

 DuMont Television Network – A commercial broadcast network owned by DuMont Laboratories, which operated from 1946 to 1956; two of its owned-and-operated stations are now owned by the Fox Television Stations subsidiary of Fox Corporation as O&Os of the Fox network.
 FamilyNet – A general interest cable network owned by the Rural Media Group; launched in 1988, it went through several owners and mainly featured a religious format; owners included Jerry Falwell and the Southern Baptist Convention before its acquisition by the Rural Media Group, the parent of the rural-focused RFD-TV in 2013. After its sale it programmed a slate of classic television programming from Sony Pictures Television until July 1, 2017, when Rural Media converted it to a Western-focused sports network, The Cowboy Channel; all remaining over-the-air carriage agreements were nullified.
 Frost Great Outdoors – A joint venture between Luken Communications and Frost Cutlery that launched in 2011 and aired outdoors programming and blocks of home shopping programming. Ceased operations in January 2020, when the last station to carry the network discontinued it.
 Hispanic Television Network – A family-oriented Spanish-language network, which operated from 2000 to July 10, 2003.
 Hughes Television Network (HTN; originally Sports Network Incorporated) – A sports-based broadcast network later owned by businessman Howard Hughes, which operated from 1956 to the 1970s.
 Inmigrante TV – The station was founded in 2010 by immigration attorney Manuel Solis. Much of the programming consists of advertising for Solis' law firm. Ceased operations in mid-2010s.
 ImaginAsian – The company ceased operations in 2011, with the television network becoming MNet.
Ion Plus: Originally launched as lifestyle network Ion Life on February 19, 2007, the network relaunched as the general entertainment network Ion Plus before being discontinued on February 28, 2021.
 La Familia Cosmovision – A Spanish-language family-oriented network; ceased operations on December 31, 2014.
 LAT TV – A Spanish-language network offering family-oriented and educational programming, which operated from May 19, 2006 to May 20, 2008.
 Light TV - A family-oriented network from MGM and Mark Burnett. Was acquired by Allen Media Group in 2020 and was renamed and reformatted to The Grio the following year.
 MGM Family Network – A commercial broadcast network, which launched in 1973.
 Más Música – A Spanish-language music video network, which operated from 1998 to January 2006; predecessor of Tr3s.
 Metromedia – A media company that owned radio and TV stations that was founded after the collapse of DuMont, airing mostly syndicated programming. It operated from 1956 to 1997. The parent company survives as MetroMedia Technologies.
 MHz WorldView – An independent, American, non-commercial public television network that broadcast newscasts and other programs from around the world from October 19, 2005 to March 1, 2020.
 Mizlou Television Network – An occasional over-the-air broadcast network and sports syndication service, which operated from 1961 to 1991.
 Mobil Showcase Network – An occasional over-the-air broadcast network, which operated in the 1950s.
 MTV2 – A general entertainment and music network owned by Viacom, which remains distributed mainly on cable and satellite providers; it became a broadcast network on January 1, 2001 when it assumed the operations of The Box, but slowly dropped its broadcast affiliates in subsequent years as existing affiliation contracts expired.
 MundoMax – MundoMax was a general entertainment network operated by Colombian broadcaster RCN Televisión SA. Launched in August 2012 as MundoFox, the network broadcast original and imported telenovelas and teleseries, as well as feature films (both dubbed and natively produced in Spanish), news and variety programming, with some imported content being sourced by RCN and NTN24. MundoMax maintained approximately 60 affiliate stations (consisting of mostly low-power stations with some full-power affiliates, with some Fox Television Stations-owned outlets carrying the network via subchannel-only affiliations to alleviate availability issues in markets where the network had a low-power affiliate and/or limited cable distribution before Fox International Channels sold its stake in MundoFox to RCN Televisión in July 2015. Some MundoMax stations aired local newscasts, while some also carry public affairs programs. The network ceased broadcast on November 30, 2016.
 National Educational Television (NET) – An educational broadcast network, which operated from 1952 to 1970. First named the Educational Television and Radio Center (ETRC) until 1958, then the National Educational Television and Radio Center (NETRC) until 1963. Predecessor to PBS.
 NBC Weather Plus – A weather-oriented digital multicast network owned by NBC Universal, which operated from November 15, 2004 to December 31, 2008; some affiliates subsequently replaced the service with an automated local weather channel under the brand NBC Plus.
 Network One (N1) – A small independent network featuring a mix of acquired and first-run programming, which operated from the mid-1990s to November 13, 1997.
 NTA Film Network – A project that flourished from 1956–1962, with anchor station WNTA in New York/Newark, gaining at its height over 100 affiliates, and drawing in the larger markets some of the stations that had lost their Dumont and/or Paramount Television Network affiliation with the cessation of those networks; a few series moved directly from Dumont to NTA in 1956. Only attempted in-pattern broadcasting nationally in one season, on one night, but had some notable programming. Continued as purely a syndicator throughout the 1960s.
 Overmyer Network (ON; launched as the United Network, not to be confused with UPN) – A short-lived commercial network, which operated from May 1 to June 1, 1967.
 Paramount Television Network – A commercial broadcast network owned by Paramount Pictures, which operated from 1949 to 1953; most of its partner stations were also affiliates of major broadcast networks, relegating it to secondary affiliations in most markets.
 PBJ – A digital multicast network from Luken Communications that featured classic cartoons and children's programming that was in operation from August 2011 until March 2016.
 PBS Kids (original network) – A digital multicast network operated by PBS, which operated from 1999 to 2005; some of its functions were assumed by the advertiser-supported cable network PBS Kids Sprout, while some of PBS' member stations and state networks carry independently programmed digital subchannels featuring children's programs produced for broadcast on the network and through public television syndication. PBS originally planned to launch a successor service, PBS Kids Go!, in October 2006, which never launched. The PBS Kids name remains in use as the branding for PBS' children's programming block.
 PBS YOU ("YOU" being an acronym for "Your Own University") – A public television network featuring a mix of instructional, news/commentary and documentary programs, which operated from the late 1990s to 2006. Many of its affiliates joined Create, a similar service from American Public Television that focuses more on craft and travel programming, after YOU ceased operations.
 PTL Satellite Network – An Evangelical Christian religious network founded by Jim and Tammy Faye Bakker, which operated from 1977 to 1987; it was known for its flagship program, the PTL Club. The network collapsed in the wake of a sex and embezzlement scandal that resulted in Jim Bakker being sentenced to prison.
 Prime Time Entertainment Network (PTEN) – An ad-hoc syndication service operated by the Prime Time Consortium, a joint venture between Warner Bros. Television and Chris-Craft Industries, in conjunction with the service's affiliates, which operated from September 1993 to September 1997; most of PTEN's affiliates would join The WB and UPN when those networks launched in January 1995, with stations subsequently pushing its programming to other timeslots not programmed by The WB and UPN.
Qubo: A children's network owned and operated by Ion Media, running from January 8, 2007 to February 28, 2021.
 Retro Jams – A digital multicast music video network, which operated from 2007 to 2008; it was carried by some low-power stations owned by Equity Media Holdings, most of which replaced it with the Retro Television Network; the music video format reappeared in 2009 after Equity terminated its affiliation agreements with RTN.
 SFM Holiday Network – A limited-run ad-hoc network that specialized in Christmas specials.
 Shop at Home Network – A home shopping network available on broadcast and cable television, which operated from 1987 to 2008; its broadcast affiliates were a mix of stations that carried the network full-time as well as overnight clearances on minor network affiliates and independent stations.
 SOI TV – A small Spanish-language network, which operated from March 2012 to January 2013. Launched with a $20 million investment, it was founded by a Venezuelan banker and former political prisoner under that country's president Hugo Chávez, who was granted asylum in the U.S.; the network used interactive broadcast technologies allowing real-time response by viewers regarding its television content via Twitter and Facebook. SOI's programming was carried by cable network La Familia beginning in December 2012; while NBCUniversal owned Telemundo stations formerly carried the network on their digital subchannels until January 2013.
 Spanish International Network (SIN) – A Spanish-language commercial network, which operated from 1961 to 1986; it is a predecessor to Univision.
 Star Television Network – This classic television network was in planning as early as 1987 and launch in 1990 then folded in 1991.
 The Tube Music Network – A music video-focused digital multicast network, which operated from 2004 to October 2007, when it folded due to financial difficulties and complications involving E/I programming.
 ThinkBright – A New York-based public broadcasting network.
 TouchVision – TouchVision was a digital multicast and broadband television network owned by Think Televisual, LLC; launched on September 16, 2013 with backing from Weigel Broadcasting which was discontinued on January 14, 2016. It featured blocks of national and international news content presented in a newsreel-style format, along with opinion and feature segments. TouchVision's programming was also syndicated to television stations in a few markets as a substitute for national morning or evening newscasts, carried as a morning programming block on Heroes & Icons.
 TuVisión – A Spanish-language commercial network owned by Pappas Telecasting Companies, which operated from 2007 to 2009.
 TV Scout – A network containing a Prevue Channel-esque scroll of all program listings in the next two hours on a market's entire television dial, including digital subchannel networks. Existed from 2012 until 2016.
 UPN (formerly an initialism for the "United Paramount Network") – A conventional general entertainment network originally owned by Viacom and Chris-Craft Industries (whose interest was acquired by Viacom in 2000, and was later spun off to CBS Corporation in 2005); operating from January 16, 1995 to September 15, 2006, CBS Corporation shut down the network to form The CW, in conjunction with The WB's co-parent Time Warner.
 Universal Sports (formerly World Championship Sports Network) – A digital multicast network offering sports programming, consisting mainly of events sanctioned for play in the Olympic Games, which operated from 2005 to December 31, 2011; at its peak, it had 56 subchannel-only affiliates (including all of NBC's owned-and-operated stations). Universal Sports transitioned into a cable and satellite-only channel on January 1, 2012, then ceased operations on November 16, 2015.
 Urban America Television (UATV) – A successor to the American Independent Network, which operated from December 3, 2001 to May 1, 2006. UATV was a small network with approximately 60 affiliates at its peak, carrying a mix of original programming, and older films and series.
 Variety Television Network – A digital multicast network owned by Newport Television, whose stations served as its affiliates, which operated from 2007 to January 2009.
 The WB – A conventional general entertainment network owned by Time Warner and the Tribune Company that operated from January 11, 1995 to September 17, 2006; Time Warner shut down the network to form The CW, in conjunction with UPN parent CBS Corporation.
 The Works – A news and general entertainment network from MGM Television that launched on April 1, 2014 and aired mostly on stations owned by Titan Broadcast Group. The network closed on February 28, 2017 with the launch of Charge! which replaced it.
 Tuff TV – A digital broadcast television network owned by Seals Entertainment Group and Luken Communications LLC.  The network shut down on August 26, 2018
 The Worship Network – A Christian nature music video television network owned by Christian Network, Inc. and carried as a subchannel on stations owned by Ion Media. It shut down in 2013.

See also

Television in the United States
High-definition television in the United States
List of United States television markets
Lists of television stations in the United States
List of United States pay television channels
Big Three television networks
 Fourth television network

Notes

1
Television networks, over-the-air
American television-related lists